Schmidt Peak is a peak along the south side of California Plateau, marking the end of a narrow ridge 3 nautical miles (6 km) northeast of Parker Bluff in the Queen Maud Mountains. Mapped by United States Geological Survey (USGS) from surveys and U.S. Navy air photos, 1960–64. Named by Advisory Committee on Antarctic Names (US-ACAN) for Dennis C. Schmidt, photographer with U.S. Navy Squadron VX-6 on Operation Deep Freeze 1963, 1964 and 1967.

Mountains of Marie Byrd Land